In ophthalmology, the posterior pole is the back of the eye, usually referring to the retina between the optic disc and the macula.

See also
 Fundus (eye)

References

Human eye anatomy